Walter Briggs may refer to:

Walter Briggs Sr. (1877–1952), owner of the Detroit Tigers and Briggs Manufacturing Company
Walter Briggs Jr. (1912–1970), son of Walter Briggs, Sr. and owner of the Detroit Tigers

See also
 Walter Biggs, American illustrator and fine art painter